Himanshu Jangra (born 21 July 2004) is an Indian footballer who plays as a forward for Indian Super League club East Bengal and its reserve team, on loan from Delhi.

He was included in The Guardian's "Next Generation" list for 2021.

Career

Early life and Youth career
Himanshu Jangra is a product of Minerva Punjab academy, he joined Minerva Punjab in 2016 after being selected during a Trial in Chandigarh. But later in 2017 he made a mark in the Hero Sub Junior I League where he scored an impressive haul of 18 goals which attracted India national team scouts.

The youngster continued his prolific form in the National leagues by scoring 9 goals and helping his team to win the Hero Junior I Leagues 2018-19 title. Later in 2019, Himanshu was adjudged as the Most Valuable Player in the SAFF Under 15 Championship. He scoring two consecutive hattricks and secured Gold Medal for Team India.

Himanshu featured for Punjab FC's reserves side in the 2020 I-League 2nd Division where he scored two goals in a solitary appearance against AU Rajasthan F.C. Impressing everyone by his performance, the attacker earned promotion to the senior side playing in the I-League where he made five appearances at the age of 15.

Jangra was roped in by Kolkata-based professional club Mohammedan S.C. playing in I-League 2nd Division. Later in the year, he signed for Techtro Swades United FC for the 2020 Himachal Football League season. He went to become top scorer of the league with scoring five goals in just four games.

Delhi FC
On 12 June 2021, he joined DSA Senior Division club Delhi FC. The club participated in 2021 Delhi 2nd Division Qualifiers for qualification to 2021 I-League 2nd division. 
On 17 July 2021, In his very first match he assisted 3 goals in 7–0 win against Rangers SC. He continued with his spectacular performance and helped Delhi FC remain top and undefeated at the end of Group Stage. He scored his first goal for the club on 31 July in final against Indian Air Force. Though they lost the game on penalties but the club was nominated to play I-League 2nd Division.

He was part of the club's impressive run till Quarter Finals of 2021 Durand Cup including a win against Indian Super League club Kerala Blasters FC.
He scored his 2nd and match winning goal for the club in 2–1 win against Kerala United FC in 2021 I-League Qualifiers preliminary round. However Delhi FC failed to qualify for 2021-22 I-League after poor performance in Final stage of qualifiers.

On 7 October 2021, he was included in The Guardians 60 Next Generation players list among the likes of Gavi and others.
He was only the second Indian to be named in the list after Bikash Yumnam made it in 2020 list.

East Bengal FC
On 20 August 2022, he joined Indian Super League club East Bengal FC on loan from Delhi FC.

International
He represented India U15 in the 2019 SAFF U-15 Championship, where he scored seven goals that included two hat-tricks as he also secured the golden boot in the process.
He scored 1 goal in 5–0 win over Turkmenistan in 2020 AFC U-16 Championship qualification

He was named in final squad of India U16 team which was to play in 2020 AFC U-16 Championship in Bahrain but was later cancelled due to Covid-19 Pandemic.

He was also part of India U20 team which won the 2022 SAFF U-20 Championship, where he scored three goals in five matches including a goal in 5-2 win against Bangladesh U20 in the Final.

Style of Play
Jangra plays mainly as a withdrawal forward or left winger. His operating area is just outside the penalty area. His inside cuts from the left side of the field make him a threat to the opposition defense. He also possesses good dribbling skills and also he can also play as an attacking midfielder and can act as a pivot between the defense and the forward line.

Career statistics

Club

Honours
India U15
SAFF U-15 Championship: 2019
India U20
SAFF U-20 Championship: 2022

Individual
SAFF U-15 Championship Most Valuable player: 2019
SAFF U-15 Championship Top scorer: 2019

References

External links

2004 births
Living people
Indian footballers
People from Hisar district
Footballers from Haryana
India youth international footballers
Association football forwards
RoundGlass Punjab FC players
I-League players
Mohammedan SC (Kolkata) players
I-League 2nd Division players